Felipe López may refer to:

Felipe López (archer) (born 1977), Spanish archer
Felipe López (author) Zapotec-language poet and scholar
Felipe López (basketball) (born 1974), retired Dominican basketball player
Felipe López (baseball) (born 1980), Puerto Rican baseball infielder
Felipe López (cyclist) (born 1969), Guatemalan Olympic cyclist
Felipe Molas López (1901–1954), former president of Paraguay